is a Japanese voice actress. She was born in Tokyo and is affiliated with Kekke Corporation.

Filmography

Television animation
 Doraemon (2005) as Nobita Nobi
 Stitch! (2010)
 And Yet the Town Moves (2010) as Young Natsuhiko Moriaki; Reporter (ep 10)

Theatrical animation
 Doraemon: Nobita's Dinosaur 2006 (2006) as Nobita Nobi
 Doraemon: Nobita's New Great Adventure into the Underworld (2007) as Nobita Nobi
 Doraemon: Nobita and the Green Giant Legend (2008) as Nobita Nobi
 Doraemon the Movie: Nobita's Spaceblazer (2009) as Nobita Nobi
 Doraemon: Nobita's Great Battle of the Mermaid King (2010) as Nobita Nobi
 Doraemon: Nobita and the New Steel Troops—Winged Angels (2011) as Nobita Nobi
 Doraemon: Nobita and the Island of Miracles—Animal Adventure (2012) as Nobita Nobi
 Doraemon: Nobita's Secret Gadget Museum (2013) as Nobita Nobi
 Stand by Me Doraemon (2014) as Nobita Nobi
 Doraemon: New Nobita's Great Demon—Peko and the Exploration Party of Five (2014) as Nobita Nobi
 Doraemon: Nobita's Space Heroes (2015) as Nobita Nobi
 Doraemon: Nobita and the Birth of Japan 2016 (2016) as Nobita Nobi
 Doraemon the Movie 2017: Great Adventure in the Antarctic Kachi Kochi (2017) as Nobita Nobi
 Doraemon the Movie: Nobita's Treasure Island (2018) as Nobita Nobi
 Doraemon: Nobita's Chronicle of the Moon Exploration (2019) as Nobita 
 Doraemon: Nobita's New Dinosaur (2020) as Nobita Nobi
 Stand by Me Doraemon 2 (2020) as Nobita Nobi
 Doraemon: Nobita's Little Star Wars 2021 (2022) as Nobita Nobi
 Doraemon: Nobita's Sky Utopia (2023) as Nobita Nobi

Video games
 Doraemon: Nobita's Dinosaur 2006 DS (2006) as Nobita Nobi
 Doraemon: Nobita no Shin Makai Daibouken DS (2007) as Nobita Nobi
 Doraemon Wii (2007) as Nobita Nobi
 Doraemon: Nobita and the Green Giant Legend DS (2008) as Nobita Nobi
 Granblue Fantasy (2021) as Nobita Nobi

Dubbing roles
 Frankenstein's Army (2013) as Eva (Cristina Catalina)

References

External links 
 

1975 births
Living people
Voice actresses from Tokyo
Japanese video game actresses
Japanese voice actresses
20th-century Japanese actresses
21st-century Japanese actresses